Adrian L. Miller is an American music entertainment executive, manager, music supervisor, and executive producer. Miller also serves as owner & managing parter of the agency, Xyion.

Miller is also known for his A&R and music management, namely the artist Anderson .Paak. Under his management, Anderson has won numerous Grammy awards, with Miller serving as executive producer for all his album releases.

Early life
Miller was born in Saint Louis, MO. Growing up, he split his time between St. Louis and Los Angeles. His father Sylvester owned a Black Circle Records Store, where Miller first became interested in music. During interviews, he recalled his father telling him about various artists and learning about music through reading credit on vinyls. His love for music from a young age pushed Miller to pursue becoming a rapper. He also spent time as a breakdancer with St. Louis City Breakers.

In 1988, Miller was accepted at the University of Tulsa where he majored in theatre and history.

Career
While studying at the University of Tulsa, Miller began working at radio station KBLK. He started with working his way into an on-air position as a host in 1989. Miller began networking while working as a host, landing other music industry roles. He worked for S.O.U.L. (Sound of Urban Listeners) and MCA street team, before he graduated from university in 1991. On returning to Los Angeles, he was hired by PMP Records where he worked alongside its founder, Paul Stewart. He got his first experience of music management as an assistant while at PMP. One of the first artists Miller was involved with was Daz Dillinger, who at the time was known under a different name. Rapper Coolio was signed under PMP Records, along with House of Pain and The Pharcyde with Miller working with all the acts in various capacities. He was redirected from Hits magazine for a short period, where he created the Rap Music Chart, which still exists until today. He then moved to Loud Records which gave Miller the opportunity to work with other acts such as Twista and Wu-Tang Clan.

In late 1991, Immortal Records was formed by Happy Walters and Amanda Demme. Miller's networking since he started at KBLK and in LA gave him the opportunity to head-up Immortal's A&R shortly after it was founded. It was at Immortal where he began to have success, namely with Funkdoobiest in 1991. Miller worked with other artists, such as Volume 10, Incubus, and Korn. After impressing at Immortal, Miller was recruited at the age of 24 by Warner Bros. Records to work as part of the label's A&R department under the music industry legend, Benny Medina. Miller managed numerous acts in the late 90s and early 2000s. Notably he found Flo Rida and managed him for a while in his early career, but struggled to get him a record deal.

In 2009, formed Xyion Inc. his music management company. His aim when he started Xyion Inc. was to find the next big thing in music. In 2011, he was working with a rap group when they introduced him to their friend, who was later to become known as Anderson .Paak. Partnering with D'Angelo's manager Dominique Trenier, Miller landed Anderson a deal with film director F. Gary Gray, to record the backing track for a Harley Davidson ad Gary was directing. From there they started working together, with Anderson releasing the Cover Art in June 2013. The success of the EP led to the creation of the record label, OBE, co-founded by Miller and Anderson .Paak.

Miller struck two huge deals in late 2014 for Anderson, which catapulted his career. The first  was for Anderson .Paak to feature on six track's on Dr. Dre's album, Compton. Compton was certified Gold by the Recording Industry Association of America (RIAA). In 2016, Miller served as executive producer on Anderson's award winning album, Malibu. It was nominated for Best Urban Contemporary Album at the 59th Annual Grammy Awards. Miller received the Cannes Lion Award for his work on the 2018 Apple Music Home Pod commercial directed by Spike Jonze. Anderson picked up numerous awards in 2016 as a result, including the 2016 Centric Certified Award for Centric Certified Award and was also nominated for Best New Artist. Anderson also picked up The Grulke Prize at SXSW 2016.

Miller recently teamed up with Delicious Vinyl record label owner Michael Ross and Leslie Cooney to reboot the label, now called Delicious Vinyl Island, whose focus is Caribbean/Future Roots and also has started A Tiny Universe with Om'Mas Keith specializing in the Eclectic Soul/Jazz/R&B. In addition to management and label ownership, Miller also currently does music supervision/music consulting for film and television projects. As of 2020, he has joined the Music Supervisors Guild. Recently, Miller released  the soundtrack to the movie Karen on his label ATU, and was also music supervisor.

References

Further reading
 Los Angeles Times: In The Digital Age, Breaking Up Is Hard To Do
 Hollywood Shuffle: We’re Finding ‘A Love’ For Adrian Miller

American music industry executives
Record producers from California
Living people
Year of birth missing (living people)